Brankica is a Serbian feminine name. It is a diminutive of the name Branka.

Notable people named Brankica
Brankica Mihajlović, Serbian volleyball player
Brankica Stanković, Serbian journalist

Serbian feminine given names